Xiang Xiang is a female giant panda born on June 12, 2017 through natural mating in the Ueno Zoo in Japan. Her father is Ri Ri and mother is Shin Shin. 

On September 20, 2017, the physical examination of "Xiang Xiang" showed that she was growing well, weighing 6 kg and measuring 65 cm in length.

The Tokyo Metropolitan Government announced on March 26, 2021, that the return of the 3-year-old Xiang Xiang to China has been postponed from May 31 to December 31 due to the COVID-19 pandemic On 21 February 2023 she returned to China.

References

2017 animal births
Individual giant pandas
Individual animals in Japan